Ambrose Goode Redhead (1805 – 11 March 1882) was an English cricketer who was associated with Cambridge Town Club and made his first-class debut in 1829.

References

1805 births
1882 deaths
English cricketers
English cricketers of 1826 to 1863
Cambridge Town Club cricketers